Tatsushi Koyanagi (小柳 達司, born February 7, 1990) is a Japanese football player who plays as a defender for J2 League club Blaublitz Akita.

Club statistics
Updated to 26 December 2022.

References

External links
Profile at Zweigen Kanazawa

1990 births
Living people
Nippon Sport Science University alumni
Association football people from Chiba Prefecture
Japanese footballers
J2 League players
Thespakusatsu Gunma players
Zweigen Kanazawa players
Ventforet Kofu players
Blaublitz Akita players
Association football defenders